The United States first established diplomatic relations with the Baltic states (Latvia, Lithuania, Estonia) in 1922. One ambassador, resident in Riga, Latvia, was appointed to all three nations. Relations with the three nations were broken after the Soviet invasion of the republics in 1940 at the beginning of World War II. The United States never recognized the legitimacy of the Soviet occupation of the Baltic states, nor the legitimacy of the governments of those states under Soviet occupation. Hence, full diplomatic relations were not resumed until 1992 after the collapse of the Soviet Union.

The U.S. Embassy in Latvia is located in Riga.

Ambassadors

Notes

See also
Latvia – United States relations
Foreign relations of Latvia
Ambassadors of the United States

References
United States Department of State: Background notes on Latvia

External links
 United States Department of State: Chiefs of Mission for Latvia
 United States Department of State: Latvia
 United States Embassy in Riga

Latvia

United States